Under the Yum Yum Tree is a 1963 American sex comedy film directed by David Swift and starring Jack Lemmon, Carol Lynley, Dean Jones, and Edie Adams, with Imogene Coca, Paul Lynde, and Robert Lansing in supporting roles. The film received two Golden Globe Award nominations in 1964: Best Motion Picture – Musical or Comedy and Best Actor – Motion Picture Musical or Comedy for Lemmon.

The film is based on the Broadway play of the same name by Lawrence Roman that first ran in 1960–61, which featured Jones in the same role.

Plot
Hogan (Jack Lemmon) is a lecherous landlord, a swinging bachelor who ogles and tries to seduce his female tenants. Women are mere playthings to him, plus he's a master con man. His bachelor pad is a holy temple of seduction: blood-red walls, African sculptures, a well-stocked cocktail bar, a switch-operated fireplace, and mechanized violins that play romantic music at the touch of a button. He walks around wearing a scarlet cardigan (with matching socks and shirts) and a devilish smirk. As the independently wealthy landlord of a beautifully-designed California apartment block that includes tropical plants, he rents rooms only to gorgeous single women at just $75 a month. An older married couple, handyman Murphy (Paul Lynde) and maid Dorcas (Imogene Coca) work for Hogan.

Irene (Edie Adams), a recently divorced tenant, has just ended a relationship with Hogan. She's moving out of the apartment with the assistance of her friend Charles (Robert Lansing). The apartment is immediately snapped up by her niece, Robin (Carol Lynley). Hogan is thrilled at the prospect of yet another beautiful tenant to seduce, but is initially unaware that Robin's short-tempered, frustrated, bumbling boyfriend David (Dean Jones) is moving in with her in a 'platonic' capacity only, to determine their compatibility.

Hogan does his best to prevent David and Robin from consummating their relationship. Irene, who has only come to realize the extent of Hogan's promiscuity, is determined to prevent him from getting his hands on her niece. Irene confronts him at his barber, and Hogan is self-defensive and comically self-deluded.

Cast
Jack Lemmon as Hogan
Carol Lynley as Robin Austin
Dean Jones as David Manning
Edie Adams as Irene Wilson
Paul Lynde as Murphy
Robert Lansing as Charles Howard
Imogene Coca as Dorcas Murphy
Joy Harmon as Ardice
Pamela Curran as Dolores
Asa Maynor as Cheryl
Laurie Sibbald as Eve
Jane Wald as Liz (woman in shower)
Celeste Yarnall as New Girl in Van
Bill Bixby as Track Team Coach
Bill Erwin as Teacher
Matty Jordan as Maitre D'
James Millhollin as The Thin Man

Other versions 
The film was adapted from a Broadway play by Lawrence Roman. The stage production opened on November 16, 1960 at Henry Miller's Theatre and ran for 173 performances. The original cast included Gig Young as Hogan, Sandra Church as Robin, and Dean Jones as David.

An hour-long unsold television pilot titled Under the Yum Yum Tree and directed by E. W. Swackhamer premiered on ABC on September 2, 1969. The manager of the apartment complex was played by Jack Sheldon and among the cast were Ryan O'Neal and Leigh Taylor-Young, who were married from 1967 to 1971. Both were stars of ABC's primetime serial Peyton Place, which broadcast its final episode three months earlier, on June 2.

Song
The song "Under the Yum Yum Tree", written by Sammy Cahn and Jimmy Van Heusen, is sung by James Darren during the opening credits, and its melody is used thematically throughout the picture.

Novelization
Slightly in advance of the film's release, as was the custom of the era, a paperback novelization of the film was published by Dell Books. The author was renowned crime and western novelist Marvin H. Albert, who also made something of a cottage industry out of movie tie-ins. He seems to have been the most prolific screenplay novelizer of the late '50s through mid '60s, and, during that time, the preeminent specialist at light comedy.

See also
List of American films of 1963

References

External links
 
 
 
 
 

1963 films
1963 romantic comedy films
1960s American films
1960s English-language films
1960s sex comedy films
American films based on plays
American romantic comedy films
American sex comedy films
Columbia Pictures films
Films about landlords
Films directed by David Swift
Films scored by Frank De Vol
Films set in apartment buildings
Films set in California